The Old Godavari Bridge (also known as The Havelock Bridge)  is a decommissioned bridge that spans the Godavari River in Andhra Pradesh, India. Commissioned in 1900, the bridge served trains plying between Howrah and Madras. It is the earliest of three bridges that span the Godavari River at Rajahmundry. The Godavari Arch Bridge was later constructed as a replacement for the Havelock Bridge. The bridge along with the Godavari bridge and Godavari Arch Bridge is one of the most recognised symbols of Rajahmundry and of the state of Andhra Pradesh.

History
The construction of the bridge commenced on 11 November 1897 and opened for traffic on 30 August 1900. The Bridge was named after Sir Arthur Elibank Havelock, the then Governor of Madras. Frederick Thomas Granville Walton served as the Engineer-in-chief assisted by executive engineers R.A.Delanougerede, F.D.Couchman, J.E.Eaglesome.

The bridge was constructed with stone masonry and steel girders. The girders were fabricated by Butterley Company of Ripley, Derbyshire The rail bridge served the busy Howrah-Chennai line until its decommissioning.

Having served its full life span of 100 years, it was decommissioned in 1997, and Godavari Arch Bridge was built as a replacement for the bridge. Today, the bridge is being used to host civic water supply pipelines.

Present status
After being planned to be converted into a national monument, historic monument now its finally planned to be converted into a tourist spot, as a pedestrian pathway. In 2008 the Municipal Corporation of Rajahmundry passed a resolution expressing willingness to take up the beautification project. With the Railways Ministry not coming forward for implementation of the project, Former Member of Parliament Vundavalli Aruna Kumar has appealed to the Railways Ministry for the approval of the project.  the project was still awaiting funds to commence.

Sister bridges
Godavari Bridge
Godavari Arch Bridge

See also
List of longest bridges in the world

References

Bridges completed in 1900
Bridges in Andhra Pradesh
Bridges over the Godavari river
Buildings and structures in Rajahmundry
Transport in Rajahmundry
Buildings and structures in East Godavari district
Transport in East Godavari district
Former railway bridges in India
1900 establishments in India
20th-century architecture in India